CAHS may refer to:
Canadian Aviation Historical Society
Carman-Ainsworth High School, a public school in Flint, Michigan
The College of Allied Health Sciences at the University of Cincinnati
Colorado Aviation Historical Society
Classical Academy High School
Columbus Alternative High School, a central Ohio public high school in the Columbus City School district
Council of Australian Humanist Societies

Classical Academy High School, home of the Caiman

"Charlotte Amalie High School - St. Thomas, USVI"